Marauder, marauders, The Marauder, or The Marauders may refer to:
 A person engaged in banditry or related activity
 Piracy
 Looting
 Outlaw
 Partisan (military)
 Robbery
 Theft

Entertainment
 Marauder, the second novel in the Isaac Asimov's Robots in Time series
 One of the four fictional characters in Harry Potter and the Prisoner of Azkaban who created the Marauder's Map
 Marauder (comics), several characters
 Marauders (comics), a Marvel Comics supervillain team
 Marauders (comic book), a Marvel Comics comic book launched in 2019
 Marauder (G.I. Joe), a fictional vehicle from the G.I. Joe Battleforce 2000 toy line
 "Marauders" (Star Trek: Enterprise), a second-season episode
 Marauders (World of Darkness), antagonists in the role-playing game Mage: The Ascension

Film
 The Marauders (1947 film), a Hopalong Cassidy film
 The Marauders (1955 film), starring Dan Duryea
 Marauders (1986 film)
 Starship Troopers 3: Marauder, a 2008 direct-to-DVD film
 Marauders (2016 film)

Music
 Marauder (Blackfoot album)
 Marauder (Interpol album)
 Marauder (Magnum album)
 Gibson Marauder, electric guitar model
 "The Marauders", a 1983 song by Tears for Fears, B-side to "The Way You Are"

Video games
 Marauder (video game), a 1988 game developed by Hewson Consultants
Marauder, a ship class in EVE Online
Marauder, a class in Star Wars: The Old Republic
Marauder, a class in Path of Exile
Marauder Faction in Ryzom
Marauder, a mech in MechWarrior (video game series)
Marauders, synthetic creatures derived from Turians in Mass Effect 3
Marauders, an enemy in Borderlands and Borderlands 2
Marauder, a class in Final Fantasy XIV: A Realm Reborn
 Savage Marauders, a variant of Locust in Gears of War 3
Marauder, a Super-heavy class demon in Doom Eternal
Marauders, a playable faction in New World (video game)

Sports
 Marauders, mascot of the University of Mary, a Christian, Catholic, and Benedictine university in Bismarck, ND.
 Marauders, mascot of St. Joseph's Collegiate Institute Catholic Boy's High School in Buffalo, New York.
 Marauders, mascot of Clearwater Central Catholic High School, Clearwater, Florida. 
 Bradenton Marauders, a Class A-Advanced baseball team
 Marauders, mascot of Mira Mesa Senior High School, San Diego, California
 Marauders, mascot of Mount Vernon High School (Fortville, Indiana)
 Massachusetts Marauders, a professional American football team
 McMaster Marauders, official mascot and sporting team for McMaster University in Hamilton, Ontario
 Millersville Marauders, athletic teams of Millersville University of Pennsylvania
 Marauder (dinghy), alternative name for the Mirror 14 class dinghy
 Marauder, mascot of Central State University, Wilberforce, Ohio
 Marauder, mascot of Jesuit High School (Sacramento), California
 Marauder, mascot of Edward S. Marcus High School, Flower Mound, Texas
 Marauder, mascot of Mitchell High School, Colorado Springs, Colorado
 Marauder, mascot of Midland Secondary School, Midland, Ontario
 Mauauders, mascot of Antelope Valley College, Lancaster, California
Marauders, mascot of Bay Shore High School, Bay shore, New York
Marauders, mascot of Miraleste High School, Rancho Palos Verdes, California
Marauders, mascot of Walter Murray Collegiate Institute, Saskatoon, Saskatchewan

Transportation
 B-26 Marauder, American bomber
 Marauder Cars, British sports car company
 Marauder (vehicle), South African armoured vehicle
 Marauder, motorcycle model series from Suzuki
 Mercury Marauder, automobile

Other uses
 MARAUDER, a U.S. government nuclear fusion research project
 Merauder, an American metalcore band
 Masked Marauder, a fictional Marvel Comics character
 Merrill's Marauders, United States commando unit in World War II